The 62nd New York State Legislature, consisting of the New York State Senate and the New York State Assembly, met from January 1 to May 7, 1839, during the first year of William H. Seward's governorship, in Albany.

Background
Under the provisions of the New York Constitution of 1821, 32 Senators were elected on general tickets in eight senatorial districts for four-year terms. They were divided into four classes, and every year eight Senate seats came up for election. Assemblymen were elected countywide on general tickets to a one-year term, the whole Assembly being renewed annually.

In 1838, Fulton County was split from Montgomery County. Fulton and Hamilton counties were joined in one Assembly district and apportioned 1 seat, the remaining 2 seats of the previous Hamilton-Montgomery district were apportioned to the now smaller Montgomery County.

At this time there were two political parties: the Democratic Party and the Whig Party.

On September 12, 1838, the Whig state convention met at Utica, and nominated William H. Seward for Governor, and Speaker Luther Bradish for Lieutenant Governor. On the same day, the Democratic state convention met at Herkimer, and nominated Gov. William L. Marcy and Lt. Gov. John Tracy unanimously for re-election.

On October 3, 1838, a state convention of former Democrats met under the name of "Conservatives" (among them U.S. Senator Nathaniel P. Tallmadge) at Syracuse, and endorsed the Whig nominees Seward and Bradish.

Elections
The State election was held from November 5 to 7, 1838. William H. Seward and Luther Bradish were elected Governor and Lieutenant Governor.

State Senator Chester Loomis (7th D.) was defeated for re-election.

Sessions
The Legislature met for the regular session at the Old State Capitol in Albany on January 1, 1839; and the Assembly adjourned on May 6, the Senate on May 7.

On January 1, George W. Patterson (W) was elected Speaker. In the Senate, the mode of appointing the standing committees was changed. The committees had usually been appointed by the lieutenant governor (who is ex officio President of the Senate). At this session, the lieutenant governor was a member of the minority party, and the Democratic majority voted to appoint the committees by ballot.

On January 26, Canal Commissioner Stephen Van Rensselaer died.

On February 4, the Legislature elected John C. Spencer (W) to succeed John A. Dix (D) as Secretary of State; Bates Cooke (W) to succeed Azariah C. Flagg (D) as State Comptroller; Willis Hall (W) to succeed Samuel Beardsley (D) as Attorney General; and Jacob Haight (W) to succeed Gamaliel H. Barstow (W) as State Treasurer.

On February 5, the Legislature failed to elect a U.S. Senator to succeed Nathaniel P. Tallmadge, and the seat became vacant on March 4, 1839.

On February 18, the Legislature elected Samuel B. Ruggles (W) a Canal Commissioner, to fill the vacancy caused by the death of Van Rensselaer.

State Senate

Districts
 The First District (4 seats) consisted of Kings, New York and Richmond counties.
 The Second District (4 seats) consisted of Dutchess, Orange, Putnam, Queens, Rockland, Suffolk, Sullivan, Ulster and Westchester counties.
 The Third District (4 seats) consisted of Albany, Columbia, Delaware, Greene, Rensselaer, Schenectady and Schoharie counties.
 The Fourth District (4 seats) consisted of Clinton, Essex, Franklin, Fulton, Hamilton, Herkimer, Montgomery, St. Lawrence, Saratoga, Warren and Washington counties.
 The Fifth District (4 seats) consisted of Jefferson, Lewis, Madison, Oneida, Oswego and Otsego counties.
 The Sixth District (4 seats) consisted of Allegany, Broome, Cattaraugus, Chemung, Chenango, Livingston, Steuben, Tioga and Tompkins counties.
 The Seventh District (4 seats) consisted of Cayuga, Cortland, Onondaga, Ontario, Seneca, Wayne and Yates counties.
 The Eighth District (4 seats) consisted of Chautauqua, Erie, Genesee, Monroe, Niagara and Orleans counties.

Note: There are now 62 counties in the State of New York. The counties which are not mentioned in this list had not yet been established, or sufficiently organized, the area being included in one or more of the abovementioned counties.

Members
The asterisk (*) denotes members of the previous Legislature who continued in office as members of this Legislature.

Employees
 Clerk: John F. Bacon
 Deputy Clerk: Chauncey Wasson
 Sergeant-at-Arms: James Livingston
 Doorkeeper: James D. Wasson

State Assembly

Districts

 Albany County (3 seats)
 Allegany County (2 seats)
 Broome County (1 seat)
 Cattaraugus County (2 seats)
 Cayuga County (3 seats)
 Chautauqua County (3 seats)
 Chemung County (1 seat)
 Chenango County (3 seats)
 Clinton County (1 seat)
 Columbia County (3 seats)
 Cortland County (2 seats)
 Delaware County (2 seats)
 Dutchess County (3 seats)
 Erie County (3 seats)
 Essex County (1 seat)
 Franklin County (1 seat)
 Fulton and Hamilton counties (1 seat)
 Genesee County (4 seats)
 Greene County (2 seats)
 Herkimer County (2 seats)
 Jefferson County (3 seats)
 Kings County (2 seats)
 Lewis County (1 seat)
 Livingston County (2 seats)
 Madison County (3 seats)
 Monroe County (3 seats)
 Montgomery County (2 seats)
 The City and County of New York (13 seats)
 Niagara County (2 seats)
 Oneida County (4 seats)
 Onondaga County (4 seats)
 Ontario County (3 seats)
 Orange County (3 seats)
 Orleans County (1 seat)
 Oswego County (2 seats)
 Otsego County (3 seats)
 Putnam County (1 seat)
 Queens County (1 seat)
 Rensselaer County (3 seats)
 Richmond County (1 seat)
 Rockland County (1 seat)
 St. Lawrence County (2 seats)
 Saratoga County (2 seats)
 Schenectady County (1 seat)
 Schoharie County (2 seats)
 Seneca County (1 seat)
 Steuben County (3 seats)
 Suffolk County (2 seats)
 Sullivan County (1 seat)
 Tioga County (1 seat)
 Tompkins County (2 seats)
 Ulster County (2 seats)
 Warren County (1 seat)
 Washington (2 seats)
 Wayne County (2 seats)
 Westchester County (2 seats)
 Yates County (1 seat)

Note: There are now 62 counties in the State of New York. The counties which are not mentioned in this list had not yet been established, or sufficiently organized, the area being included in one or more of the abovementioned counties.

Assemblymen
The asterisk (*) denotes members of the previous Legislature who continued as members of this Legislature.

Employees
 Clerk: Jarvis N. Lake
 Sergeant-at-Arms: William DeForest
 Doorkeeper: Samuel Francis Jr.
 Assistant Doorkeeper: Washington P. Lewis

Notes

Sources
 The New York Civil List compiled by Franklin Benjamin Hough (Weed, Parsons and Co., 1858) [pg. 109 and 441 for Senate districts; pg. 132 for senators; pg. 148f for Assembly districts; pg. 221ff for assemblymen]
 The History of Political Parties in the State of New-York, from the Ratification of the Federal Constitution to 1840 by Jabez D. Hammond (4th ed., Vol. 2, Phinney & Co., Buffalo, 1850; pg. 486ff and 506 to 517)
The Politician's Register published by Horace Greeley (1840; pg. 10f)
Journal of the Senate (62nd Session) (1839)

062
1839 in New York (state)
1839 U.S. legislative sessions